Woman in the Wings  is the debut solo studio album by English singer Maddy Prior, the lead vocalist of Steeleye Span. The album was released in May 1978 by Chrysalis Records. It was produced by Ian Anderson, Dee Palmer and  Robin Black. All the songs on the album were written by Prior.

Track listing
 "Woman in the Wings"
 "Cold Flame"
 "Mother and Child"
 "Gutter Geese"
 "Rollercoaster"
 "Deep Water"
 "Long Shadows"
 "I Told You So"
 "Rosettes"
 "Catseyes"
 "Baggy Pants"

Personnel
 Maddy Prior - vocals
 Andy Roberts - guitar except on tracks 3, 5 and 6.
 Martin Barre - guitar solo on track 2.
 Bob Gill - guitar on track 8.
 John Glascock - bass on tracks 1, 7, 9, 10.
 David Olney - bass on tracks 2, 4, 8, 11.
 Dee Palmer - keyboards on tracks 1 and 3.
 Barry Booth - piano on tracks 2 and 11.
 Ian Anderson - flute on track 4.
 Shona Anderson - backing vocals on track 10.
 Cherry Gillespie - backing vocals on track 10.
 Barriemore Barlow - drums except on tracks 3, 5, 6, 7 and 11.
 John Halsey - drums on tracks 4 and 11.

References

External links 
 womaninthewings
 greenmanreview

Maddy Prior albums
1978 debut albums
Chrysalis Records albums
Albums produced by Ian Anderson